Ibutamoren (developmental code names MK-677, MK-0677, LUM-201, L-163,191; former tentative brand name Oratrope) is a potent, long-acting, orally-active, selective, and non-peptide agonist of the ghrelin receptor and a growth hormone secretagogue, mimicking the growth hormone (GH)-stimulating action of the endogenous hormone ghrelin. It has been shown to increase the secretion of several hormones including GH and insulin-like growth factor 1 (IGF-1) and produces sustained increases in the plasma levels of these hormones without affecting cortisol levels.

Effect on lean mass 
Ibutamoren has been shown to sustain activation of the GH–IGF-1 axis and to increase lean body mass with no change in total fat mass or visceral fat. It is under investigation as a potential treatment for reduced levels of these hormones, such as in children or elderly adults with growth hormone deficiency, and human studies have shown it to increase both muscle mass and bone mineral density, making it a promising potential therapy for the treatment of frailty in the elderly. As of June 2017, ibutamoren is in the preclinical stage of development for growth hormone deficiency.

Effect on sleep architecture 
In a small study of 14 subjects, MK-677 dosed at 25mg/day at bedtime was shown to increase REM sleep by 20% and 50% in young and older subjects respectively. Treatment with MK-677 also resulted in an approximate 50% increase in stage IV sleep in young subjects.

Non-research use 
Since MK-677 is still an Investigational New Drug, it has not yet been approved to be marketed for consumption by humans in the United States. However, it has been used experimentally by some in the bodybuilding community. Since it chemically mimics the hormone ghrelin, it functions as a neuropeptide in the central nervous system and crosses the blood-brain-barrier.

See also 
 List of growth hormone secretagogues
 Ghrelin

References

External links 
 Ibutamoren - AdisInsight
 MK-677 and A Potential Dementia Link - Loungecity.org
Ghrelin Over-Stimulation, Molecular Psychiatry Study - Nature.org

4-Phenylpiperidines
Anti-aging substances
Experimental drugs
Ghrelin receptor agonists
Growth hormone secretagogues
Indolines
Spiro compounds
Orphan drugs